Jeff Mitchell Joseph Bandura (born April 2, 1957) is a Canadian retired professional ice hockey player.

Born in White Rock, British Columbia, Bandura played junior hockey in the Western Canada Hockey League for the Calgary Centennials, Edmonton Oil Kings and Portland Winter Hawks.

He was drafted in the second round, 22nd overall by the Vancouver Canucks in the 1977 NHL Entry Draft. He played in the Canucks organization in the minors (Central Hockey League) with the Tulsa Oilers and Dallas Blackhawks before being traded along with Jere Gillis to the New York Rangers. After the trade, he spent the majority of his time with the Rangers affiliate the New Haven Nighthawks of the American Hockey League before being called up by the New York Rangers in the 1980–81 season, where he would only play 2 games.

He then played one season for HC Fribourg-Gotteron in Switzerland. After returning from Europe, Bandura played one more season in the AHL for the Maine Mariners; the Mariners went on to win the Calder Cup. He retired from hockey after that season.

Career statistics

External links
 Legends of Hockey
 

1957 births
Calgary Centennials players
Canadian ice hockey defencemen
Dallas Black Hawks players
Edmonton Oil Kings (WCHL) players
HC Fribourg-Gottéron players
Ice hockey people from British Columbia
Living people
Maine Mariners players
Merritt Centennials players
New Haven Nighthawks players
New York Rangers players
People from White Rock, British Columbia
Portland Winterhawks players
Tulsa Oilers (1964–1984) players
Vancouver Canucks draft picks